M1 is a Ukrainian music television channel. The channel shows lifestyle and music related programs. M1 is a part of Starlight Media broadcasting group, created by Viktor Pinchuk.

Referred sources

See also 
 List of Ukrainian-language television channels

External links
 Official website

2001 establishments in Ukraine
Ukrainian brands
Television stations in Ukraine
Television channels and stations established in 2001
Ukrainian-language television stations